Menaka Lalwani is an Indian actress. She is known for her appearances in Indian soap operas. Lalwani is a professional model, beauty pageant contestant and trained classical dancer. She made her Hindi film debut with the 2013 film Miss Lovely.

Early life 

Lalwani was born in Baroda. After graduating, she studied advertising and public relations.

Television 

 Aahat
Na Aana Is Des Lado as Rangeeli Avtar  Sangwan
 CID as Various Characters

Filmography 
Chameli (film) (Hindi) - 2003
Pyar Kare Dis: Feel the Power of Love (Sindhi) - 2007 - Puja
Miss Lovely (Hindi) - 2012
Chudail Story (Hindi) - 2016 - as Ria

References 

Living people
Indian soap opera actresses
Indian television actresses
Indian female classical dancers
Indian voice actresses
Actresses in Hindi cinema
Year of birth missing (living people)
Sindhi people
Actresses from Mumbai
21st-century Indian actresses
Dancers from Maharashtra